Purvis is a U.S. city in and the county seat of Lamar County, Mississippi. It is part of the Hattiesburg, Mississippi Metropolitan Statistical Area. The population was 2,175 at the 2010 census. The Town of Purvis was incorporated on February 25, 1888  and was founded by and named after Thomas Melville Purves, originally of Marion County, Alabama. Purves, born March 8, 1820, was a second generation Scottish-American; his grandfather emigrated to Charleston, South Carolina in 1765.

History

Purves acquired a land grant in 1870 for a parcel of real estate which was located, at that time, in Marion County, Mississippi. Dorothy, also known as Dollie or Dolly, was a doctor who tended the sick of the area and delivered babies. Purves built a two-room log cabin for his family with an open fireplace in one room used for cooking and heating. John, Thomas Purves' third surviving child, was the town's first Mayor.

In 1884, the New Orleans and Northeastern Railroad gained right-of-way on Purves' property and a depot was erected, along with a marker, reading "Purvis". There were various recognized spellings of Scottish Clan Purves (surname) with both names previously listed being only a few of many. Purves eventually changed the spelling of his surname to match the town's depot marker which you can see evidenced on his tombstone located in Fillingame Cemetery in Purvis. Purves built and ran the first boarding house for the men who were working on laying rails for the New Orleans and Northeastern Railroad. This building was called a "section house" because that is what a house built for railroad crew was termed at that time. Mrs. Anna Bufkin was a member of one of the first families to live in the section house as her husband was one that helped grade and build that part of the railroad in Purvis. There were around fifty men in the crew working in that area and the water supply was inadequate for that many additional people. They found a second source of water from a spring across the railroad track that was originally used by Thomas Purves (Grandpa Purvis) years before the town sprang into existence.

Lamar became a county on February 19, 1904, in House Bill 166 and was formed from the second Judicial District of Marion County. The county was named after Lucius Quintus Cincinnatus Lamar II, who was elected to Mississippi Congress in 1872 and has one county each in Mississippi, Alabama and Georgia named after him. The town of Purvis was designated as the county seat of the county Lamar with the depot of the New Orleans and Northeastern Railroad listed as the town's center and the lines to run with the cardinal points of the compass.

Purvis began as a sawmill town and is noted to be located on the highest point on the Southern Railroad between Meridian and New Orleans by James Bounds, land surveyor, MS REG # L.S.1021. The first homesteaders of the area farmed and would only have to make 2-3 trips to "town" for supplies a year. The best route and the trading post most used was the Pass Christian trading post, some ninety miles south of the area which took eleven days in ox-cart to travel.

James Bounds, surveyor, stated:

It may be of interest to note the location of the old Pass Christian Road on a map of Stone and Pearl River Counties. This road was used very much by the early settlers of Lamar County to travel south to the coast for supplies. This road followed a natural divide between the water-sheds of Wolf River and Big Black Creek, of which the head waters originate in Lamar County. This road was one of necessity. It crossed no branches or streams of any kind and was one of the main roads of travel until modern means of transportation came into use after the American Civil War.

When the town was in its infancy, lumber companies bought large tracts of virgin pine forested land and erected sawmills at sites along the newly developing rail line. A special meeting of the board of supervisors was held in January 1905, for the purpose of giving a contract for a new courthouse to be built for the sum of $43,516 to P.H. Weathers (architect) of Jackson, Mississippi. This two-story brick and stone building was to replace the frame courthouse that in use at the time. The new Lamar County Courthouse was completed in 1905 at a cost of $50,000 only to be damaged by the 1908 Dixie tornado outbreak, then subsequently demolished by fire in 1934. The building was reconstructed and expanded in 1956 but has fallen into disrepair in recent years. Lamar County Administrator Chuck Bennett stated on December 30, 2008, that the courthouse is slated for a complete renovation that could cost up to $44,000,000 and could take up to four years to complete. Preliminary work began in 2006 and some items have already been paid in full, such as engineering services and an asbestos study.

Geography
Purvis is located at  (31.142616, -89.407724).

Because of a well-known system of aquifers and sand mines, this area was selected for "project dribble" to be the site of nuclear tests by the US government during 1961 to 1968 to measure seismic activity.

Major highways
 Interstate 59
 US 11 (MS)
 Mississippi Highway 589

Purvis is part of the area known as the Pine Belt (Mississippi) due to overwhelming number of longleaf pine trees that populate the forests.

Climate
Purvis is located in the Deep South, in a humid subtropical area of the country with hot summers and mild winters. Located in USDA Hardiness Zone 8, the climate supports a large variety of foliage and plants. Purvis receives about 62 inches of rain annually, January being the wettest month averaging , which provides for the lush growth of native plants and trees. January is also the coldest month of the year with an average temperature of 60 degrees during the daytime and 36 degrees at night.

Summers are long with 80 degree temperatures beginning in May or sometimes sooner and lasting normally until the first weeks of October. Night temperatures do not usually vary greatly from daytime temperatures, usually dropping only 21 -24 degrees. Heat indexes can soar during the summer months due to high humidity and long hours of sunshine, causing a 93 degree day to feel as if it were 101 degrees. Afternoon showers and thunderstorms are to be expected during summer months but are often short lived. July is, on average, the hottest month of the year at 92 degrees, without counting the varying heat index.

Snowfall is rare and when it does occur it usually is only  or less. Purvis averages freezing temperatures only a few times a winter. The record high was in 1951 at 106 degrees and the record low in 1985 at 4 degrees. On February 23, 2016, a tornado hit Purvis, killing one.

Demographics

2020 census

As of the 2020 United States census, there were 1,909 people, 821 households, and 496 families residing in the city.

2000 census
As of the census of 2000, there were 2,164 people, 786 households, and 577 families residing in the city. The population density was 551.0 people per square mile (212.6/km). There were 844 housing units at an average density of 214.9 per square mile (82.9/km). The racial makeup of the city was 70.84% White, 27.68% African American, 0.18% Native American, 0.14% Asian, 0.23% from other races, and 0.92% from two or more races. Hispanic or Latino of any race were 1.06% of the population.

There were 786 households, out of which 34.9% had children under the age of 18 living with them, 48.2% were married couples living together, 20.2% had a female householder with no husband present, and 26.5% were non-families. 24.8% of all households were made up of individuals, and 11.6% had someone living alone who was 65 years of age or older. The average household size was 2.67 and the average family size was 3.16.

In the city, the population was spread out, with 27.6% under the age of 18, 10.2% from 18 to 24, 27.2% from 25 to 44, 21.9% from 45 to 64, and 13.1% who were 65 years of age or older. The median age was 35 years. For every 100 females, there were 90.8 males. For every 100 females age 18 and over, there were 82.8 males.

The median income for a household in the city was $30,938, and the median income for a family was $35,000. Males had a median income of $27,571 versus $17,500 for females. The per capita income for the city was $13,727. About 11.3% of families and 14.6% of the population were below the poverty line, including 20.0% of those under age 18 and 13.6% of those age 65 or over.

Government
The United States Postal Service operates the Purvis Post Office in Purvis.

The Mississippi Department of Mental Health operates the South Mississippi State Hospital in unincorporated Lamar County, near Purvis.

Education
The Purvis School System's mascot is a tornado as a testament of the courage of those who endured the Tornadoes of 1908, which changed the face of the emerging town, and in honor of those who lost their lives that day. The city of Purvis is serviced by the Lamar County School District which includes the following:

 Purvis Lower Elementary School K-2
 Purvis Upper Elementary School 3-5
 Purvis Middle School 6-8
 Purvis High School 9-12

Private Schools include:
 Lamar Christian School
 Bass Memorial Academy

Noteworthy events

Military contributions

The citizens of Purvis have contributed greatly to the various branches of the United States Military beginning long before the town was incorporated. The War Memorial located on the grounds of the Old Lamar County Courthouse holds testament of the sacrifices the families of the area have made. The Purvis City Park is dedicated to the men and women who served in World War II and one of the main thoroughfares through the city is named in honor of one of its decorated servicemen.

Tornadoes of 1908

On April 24, 1908, three F4 (207-260 mph) tornadoes left a line of destruction from Livingston Parish, Louisiana northeast to Wayne County. This line of storms left 143 people dead, with 83 dead in Purvis alone. From the reports of Dr. H.R. Hermesch, Assistant Surgeon U.S. Navy and the Relief Committee at Purvis, we know that there were 83 dead, 340 wounded and 1935 destitute in the town of Purvis. The large "Town Clock" in the domed tower of the courthouse of the time, sustained damage from flying debris and was stopped at 2:13 in the afternoon. 

An excerpt from the booklet "The Purvis Tornado" by the Lamar County Historical Society, 2004:

"The first thought was of Hattiesburg for help. All the wires were down, and they could not telegraph this city for help, so Sheriff George W. Holleman saddled his horse and W.B. Alsworth mounted the steed, and started across the country for Richburg, 10 miles distance toward Hattiesburg. Mr. Alsworth urged the horse for all he was worth, dashing three veritable creeks, and over rough roads. He made the trip in less than fifty minutes. A second messenger was sent behind Mr. Alsworth, so that if anything happened, the other man might reach the goal and send the news. The other messenger was J.C. Calhoun. Both men reached Richburg about 3 o'clock, Mr. Alsworth sometime ahead of Mr. Calhoun.

Alsworth wired direct over the telephone to Mayor J.D. Donald, asking for physicians to come to the relief of the stricken town.

Mayor Donald immediately made the fact known in the city. A special train over the North Eastern was the result. Thus the new of the terrible disaster was communicated to the outside world."

The depot of the New Orleans and Northeastern Railroad, which was responsible for the success of the bustling, growing town, was one of the first public buildings demolished by the twisters and was thrown across the tracks. Railroad cars standing in front of the depot were carried away by the winds. Over 115 businesses, buildings and homes were completely demolished or partially destroyed and the entire African-American section of town was wiped out. The Purvis High School graduating Class of 1908's commencement exercises were due to start the night the tornado hit and part of the exercises had been previously performed the morning of the tornado. The morning exercises were completed at the two story brick schoolhouse on Mitchell Street just one hour before the storm hit and had it lasted one hour longer, the death toll would have been far greater for the entire second floor of the schoolhouse was removed by the twister.

Hurricanes
Purvis has felt the winds of quite a few tropical systems over the years; especially considering how many miles from the Mississippi Gulf Coast the city is located. Category 3 Hurricane Ethel came in 1960 but died down to a tropical storm by the time she had reached the area. Hurricane Hilda in 1964 was not a Category 4 but an extratropical low when she deposited rain in Lamar County. Due to the close proximity of Lamar County to Louisiana, Hurricane Betsy in 1965 also left Purvis some rain. The eye of Hurricane Camille came directly over Lamar County in 1969 and was the largest, costliest and most deadly hurricane to hit the Mississippi Gulf Coast until the monster storm Katrina in 2005. Hurricane Bob made an appearance in 1979 but was quickly forgotten when Hurricane Elena made her way over the area in 1985 as a Category 3 storm. That same year, Purvis received more rain than wind from Category 1 Hurricane Juan. Hurricane Florence passed by in 1988, leaving only rain as a weakening Category 1 storm. In 1992, Hurricane Andrew had thankfully died down from its original Category 5 when it came over and dropped  of rain. Hurricane Georges gave Purvis 5–7 inches of precipitation in 1998, and also some wind before curving back over Alabama. Tropical Storm Allison oddly stayed together long enough to still have an eye like feature over Purvis after traveling from Texas and Louisiana in 2001 and dumped 10–15 inches of rain on Lamar County.

Mississippi felt the effects of The Hurricane in 2005, Hurricane Katrina, which hit the area as a weakening Category 2 hurricane after reaching Category 5 strength in the Gulf of Mexico. This storm killed 1836 people, 238 of them in Mississippi. The effects from this hurricane can still be seen four years later in the forests around Purvis. Hurricane Gustav passed a little south of the area in 2008 but was close enough to leave wind and rain in its wake.

1960s Vela Uniform/Project Dribble Nuclear Tests 
Vela Uniform was an element of Project Vela conducted jointly by the United States Department of Energy (DOE) and the Advanced Research Projects Agency (ARPA).  Its purpose was to develop seismic methods for detecting underground nuclear testing.

The Project Dribble program involved two nuclear detonations called Salmon and Sterling that were conducted within Tatum Salt Dome southwest of the Hattiesburg/Purvis area in the late 1960s.

The Sterling Event was the fourth nuclear detonation involved in a study, identified as Project Dribble, sponsored by the Department of Defense's Advanced Research Project Agency. Project Dribble involved the recording and identification of seismic signals from underground detonations. These studies are part of a seismic research program called Vela Uniform which is designed to improve the United States' capability to detect, identify, and locate underground nuclear detonations.

Project Dribble's purpose was to give U.S. scientists experience in detecting underground nuclear tests in the Soviet Union. The second bomb, much smaller, was exploded two years later within the cavity created by the first blast.

Notable people
 William Andrews III, former member of the Mississippi House of Representatives
 Lacey Chabert, film and television actress.
 Lillian McMurry, record producer and owner of Trumpet Records
 Johnny Rawls, soul blues singer and guitarist
 Willie Shelby, collegiate and NFL football player.
 Ronald J. Slay, first head football coach for the University of Southern Mississippi
 Walter Young, major league baseball player.

In popular culture
Referenced in the song "Mississippi" off the CD The Good Times by Afroman. Afroman is said to be "swerving his Cadillac through Purvis."

References

External links

 The CLUI Land Use Database: Salmon and Sterling Nuclear Test Sites
 Significant Past Weather Occurrences in the South Central States
 Epic Disasters
 Fact Sheet on Purvis, Salmon Nuclear Test Site
 Lamar County School District Website
 Purvis Lower Elementary Website
 Purvis Upper Elementary Website
 Purvis Middle School Website
 Purvis High School Website
 Lamar Christian School Website
 Bass Memorial Academy Website
  Lamar County Public Library
  Little Black Creek Water Park

Cities in Mississippi
Cities in Lamar County, Mississippi
County seats in Mississippi
Cities in Hattiesburg metropolitan area